The DAF F218 and later F220 is the name of a modular cab used on a series of medium-duty trucks produced by the Dutch manufacturer DAF from early 1970 until the mid-1990s. The names reflect the cab width in centimetres, at  respectively. DAF's first tilting cab design, all in steel, it also benefitted from a new  diesel inline-six. After a thorough facelift with a new front clip in the style of the larger F241 series, the cab was renamed the F220 in 1976. The range was originally sold as the F1600 or F2000, with the new model F220 marketed as the F2300. Gradually, a number of other iterations appeared, with the range eventually stretching from the 1700 to the intercooled 2700 ATi.

History

F218
Introduced in early 1970, the DAF F1600 and F2000 were all-new and tilted for ease of access. The cab used standard pressings and was designed so as to easily allow for a large number of variations to be developed. Both rigids and tractors were offered from the get go. The new 8.25 liter cross-flow six-cylinder diesel was offered in naturally aspirated (DH825) or turbocharged (DHB825) forms, with either  SAE. The more powerful models showed the strongest sales.

F198
It was available as the F1200 or the F1400 and was meant for light duty work. This version was short-lived, being replaced in 1975 by DAF's new 500-1300 range which used the all new Club of Four cab, built by Magirus in Ulm, Germany. The larger F1400 receives the 5760 cc DD575 diesel motor with  DIN at 2400 rpm. The range seems to have been produced for another few years in small numbers, until around 1978 (when the heavier F1300 and F1500 Club of Four models were introduced).

F220

In 1976, at the Earl's Court Commercial Motor Show, the F2300 appeared. This model had been developed due to pressure from the British sales network, and DAF, seeing a sales potential in Europe as well, was happy to oblige. The facelifted 2300 received an all new front appearance, looking like a smaller version of the DAF 2800 (which is exactly what it was). The 2300 was available with two, three, or four axles. The new cab design was called the F220. It replaced the F2200, and soon thereafter a series of smaller variations appeared, replacing the old F218 cabs entirely. Either a short or a sleeper design were available. The heavier 2100 and up models have twin round headlights mounted down low, while the lighter F1600 and 1800 have single rectangular headlamps mounted in the bumper.

A choice of six-, nine-, or twelve-speed manual transmissions were on offer for the 2300, while the smaller 2100 received six-speed transmissions with or without synchronization. The 2300's cabin was mounted 40 mm higher than on the old 2200 (F218) to allow room for the intercooler plumbing, requiring extra grab handles on the door pillar. The 2300 was a considerable success in the United Kingdom, where it outsold bigger brother 2800 and made DAF a name to be reckoned with. In the early months of 1982, the DAF F2500 arrived. The power delivery was somewhat peaky, meaning that multiple gears were a necessity. Standard fitment was the six-speed S.6-90 transmission with a splitter for twelve total gears, and a sixteen-speed "Ecosplit" ZF 16S112 was an available option. As with the 2300, the 2500 was available with a short or a sleeper cab, two to four axles, as tractors or as rigid trucks. The more powerful engine made it more fuel efficient than the 2300 as well as quicker and easier to drive.

Facelift
The F1600 and F1800 were replaced by the modernized 1700 and 1900 in 1987; their front continued DAF's new family design as introduced with the new 95. This facelift also found its way onto the 2100, 2300, and 2500 models. At the Auto RAI in Amsterdam 1989, the new ATi-engined 2700 appeared, supplanting the 2500 in many markets. As for the 2500, the 2700 was designed for inter-regional use, rather than for real long-distance work. While more modern, the nearly twenty years old cab design was beginning to show its age, with questionable ergonomics and a small front windscreen. The new HS 200 ATi engine received DAF's new "Advanced Turbocharged Intercooling" and produces , a very high specific output for the time.

After the 1987 merger of Leyland and DAF, the 2300 and 2700 series replaced the Leyland (T45) Cruiser in the British market.

The F218 and F220 cabs were also used for a number of military vehicles provided to the Dutch Armed Forces from 1976 into the 21st century. Originally as the YA-4440 rigid, other models are the 5441, 4442, 5442. Tractors are called YAV/YAZ-2300.

References
 

F218
Vehicles introduced in 1970